Conan of Cimmeria may refer to:

 Conan the Barbarian, the character
 Conan of Cimmeria, the 1969 Lancer Books collection
 Conan of Cimmeria (1932-1936), the 2000s Wandering Star collections
 Conan of Cimmeria: Volume One (1932–1933), the 2002 Wandering Star collection
 Conan of Cimmeria: Volume Two (1934), the 2004 Wandering Star collection
 Conan of Cimmeria: Volume Three (1935–1936), the 2009 Wandering Star collection

See also
 Cimmeria (disambiguation)
 Conan (disambiguation)
 Conan the Cimmerian (disambiguation)
 Conan the Adventurer (disambiguation)
 Conan the Barbarian (disambiguation)
 Conan the Conqueror (disambiguation)
 Conan the Destroyer (disambiguation)